The Sibiu Rally Romania, known originally as the Raliul Sibiului, is an international rally racing event based in Transylvania in central Romania. The event is a round of the European Rally Championship, the Romanian Rally Championship and the Bulgarian Rally Championship. Previously the event had been a round of the Intercontinental Rally Challenge and has been a predominantly gravel event since inception with some stages held on tarmac.

First run in 2001 as a round of the Romanian championship held in the middle of the year, originally in August before settling into a July date. The event became an international event for the first time in 2012 when it was added to the Intercontinental Challenge and Romania was added to the event name as Sibiului Raliul Romania. It was one of four events added to the calendar and slid into a mid-season gap when Atlantic Ocean island event Rallye Açores was moved to the start of the season. The event survived the merger of the Intercontinental Challenge and the European Championship into 2013 when the rally acquired its current name.

Romanian drivers dominated the events early history, the first foreign victor was Finn Jarkko Miettinen in 2008. Constantin Aur is the most successful driver in the events history, winning four times in a five year period. Norwegian driver Andreas Mikkelsen won the first international event in 2012, with Czech driver
Jan Kopecký winning the first European championship round.

List of winners
Sourced in part from:

References

External links
Official website
European Rally Championship

Rally competitions in Romania
Sibiu